Ben Onu Çok Sevdim is a 2013 Turkish TV series. The show was produced by Pana Film and directed by  Mehmet Bahadır Er and Eylem Koza. Adnan Menderes was played by Mehmet Aslantuğ. The series ended in January 2014.

Story
Adnan Menderes came to power in the Democratic Party government in 1950. The prime minister described the period of turbulent processes, following the Korean War, the Soviet threat, the NATO accession process, governance during the increasingly difficult political climate and the junta's plans to overthrow the government. Menderes faced all kinds of difficulties with his family and colleagues.

Cast

External links
 
 

Turkish drama television series
Television series by Pana Film
2013 Turkish television series debuts
ATV (Turkey) original programming
Adnan Menderes
2014 Turkish television series endings
Television series produced in Istanbul
Television shows set in Istanbul
Television series set in the 2010s